The stele of Prusias is one of the ex votos at the sanctuary of Apollo in Delphi, constructed in honour of king Prusias II of Bithynia.

Construction and testimonies
It has been restored  in situ. The monument has been identified through an inscription mentioning that it was dedicated  by the Aetolian League to honour king Prusias II of Bithynia, in northwestern Asia Minor: 
«».(To the king Prusias, son of king Prusias, the Aetolian League for his virtue and the benefactions he bestowed upon them).
Due  to  this inscription it was also possible  to date the ex voto  after 182 BC, when Prusias II succeeded his father, Prusias I, on the throne of Bithynia.

Description
The monument consists of a tall base made of rows of rectangular blocks, whereas on its upper part it bears a decoration in relief depicting garlands and bucraniums; the decoration included  also  a low molding with supports (geisipodes). Its total  height reached 9.70 meters. At the top stood the statue of king Prusias on horseback. On the upper part  of the monument rows  of  rectangular slits are possibly  related to  the entire composition, as they might have been used  to fasten floral  motifs, such as crops, which probably alluded to  the benefaction of the king.  They could also have contained bronze blades aiming at protecting the monument against  the birds. The monument was similar to the pedestal the Monument of Aemilius Paullus, set up about 15 years later to the south of the entrance of the temple of Apollo, nowadays exhibited in the Archaeological Museum of Delphi.

Bibliography
Miller, G.,(2000) "Macedonians at Delphi", in Jacquemin, A. (ed.), Delphes: Cent ans après la grande fouille, Athens, pp. 263–281. 
Perrie, A.,(2008) "La moisson et les pigeons. Note sur l’assise sommitale du pilier de Prusias à Delphes", BCH 138,257-270 
Schalles, H.-J.,(1985) Untersuchungen zur Kulturpolitik der pergamenischen Herrscher im dritten Jahrhundert vor Christus, IstForsch 36,124 Note 723 
Vatin, Cl., Monuments votifs de Delphes, Rome 1991

References

External links

Ancient Greek buildings and structures in Delphi
Steles
Aetolian League
Votive offering